Jin Taw Yan, is a Mahayana Buddhist temple located on Strand Road in Mandalay, Myanmar (Burma). The temple was officially opened on 18 February 2014, and faces the Irrawaddy River. Construction began in 2009, and cost approximately 4.5 billion kyats, with 20% of funds coming from the Capital Diamond Star Group. The temple is reputed to be Myanmar's largest Chinese temple.

References 

Buddhist temples in Myanmar
21st-century Buddhist temples
Buildings and structures in Mandalay
Religious buildings and structures completed in 2014